Ola Alsheikh, also known as Ola Abbas Alsheikh Omer (born in Omdurman, Sudan), is a Sudanese freelance documentary photographer. She is mainly known for her pictures of everyday life and social events in Khartoum. In her work, she has placed a special focus on images of women and girls, as well as on the social and ethnic diversity in Sudan.

Life and artistic career 

Alsheikh was born in Omdurman, Sudan, and grew up in Germany, Saudi Arabia and Sudan. She holds a degree in Electrical Engineering of the University of Khartoum.

According to a report by BBC News, as a female photographer she has encountered mockery or even harassment, while taking photographs in the streets of Khartoum. She attributes this negative attitude to the fact that people in Khartoum are not used to seeing a woman with a camera in the streets. But despite this, she was quoted in the report: "I want to show real life in Sudan - we've been marginalised by the rest of the world for a long time."

In October 2018, Amateur Photographer magazine published an article about Alsheikh's pictures of modern Sudan. According to this article, Alsheikh bought her first film camera in 1998, but only got seriously involved in documentary photography about twelve years later, when she switched to digital cameras. Since then, she has used her camera to document everyday life, trying to change social awareness. As an example for her aims to document special events and celebrations in Sudan, the article mentions her photographs of popular Sufi rituals in Omdurman, part of greater Khartoum.

During the Sudanese revolution of 2018/19, BBC News published her pictures of demonstrators calling for former president Omar al-Bashir and his government to resign. In 2019, the French newspaper Le Monde published her photo in a story about Eritrean refugees in Khartoum.

See also 
 Photography in Sudan
Women in Sudan

External links 
 Personal webpage
 Being a journalist in Sudan: I face mockery, rejection and harassment, video report by BBC Africa One Minute Stories
 Sudan's Invisible Heroes, Ola Alsheikh's photo story about blind people and dedicated teachers in Khartoum

References 

Sudanese photographers
People from Omdurman
Living people
Year of birth missing (living people)
21st-century Sudanese artists
Sudanese women photographers